The Ōhakuri Dam is a dam and hydroelectric power station on the Waikato River, central North Island, New Zealand, midway between Taupō, Rotorua and Hamilton.

It was commissioned in 1961 and construction was organised from the 'hydro town' of Mangakino. The dam eventually created Lake Ohakuri, the largest artificial lake on the Waikato, which drowned two thirds of the Orakei Korako geothermal area as well as hot springs and wahi tapu (Māori sacred sites) at Te Ohaaki. Creation of the dam forced Ngāti Tahu to relocate their Ohaaki Marae.  The submerged area also included Minginui Geyser and Orakei Korako Geyser, two of the world's largest geysers.

The construction in the face of these negative effects was considered justified at the time due to the serious electricity shortages plaguing the country after World War II, and by the fact that laws requiring public participation or consultation were not introduced until much later. While compensation to Māori land owners was paid based on the land take rules of the Public Works Act, the damage to the inhabitants of the area was to form basis of further legal actions under the Waitangi Tribunal legislation many years later.

Power station

Gallery

References

Further reading

External links

 Hydro Stations: Ohakuri (from the Mighty River Power website. Retrieved 2007-12-01.)

Dams completed in 1961
Buildings and structures in Waikato
Dams in New Zealand
Waikato River
1961 establishments in New Zealand
Ngāti Tahu
Gravity dams
Earth-filled dams